Ivao Group is a group of cinder cones located in the southern part of Urup Island, Kuril Islands, Russia.

See also
 List of volcanoes in Russia

References 
 

Urup
Cinder cones
Volcanoes of the Kuril Islands
Holocene volcanoes
Holocene Asia